The 2003 Mid-American Conference baseball tournament took place in May 2003. The top six regular season finishers met in the double-elimination tournament held at Gene Michael Field on the campus of Kent State University in Kent, Ohio. This was the fifteenth Mid-American Conference postseason tournament to determine a champion. Fourth seed  won their third tournament championship, and first since the event resumed in 1992, to earn the conference's automatic bid to the 2003 NCAA Division I baseball tournament.

Seeding and format 
The winner of each division claimed the top two seeds, while the next four finishers based on conference winning percentage only, regardless of division, participated in the tournament. The teams played double-elimination tournament. This was the sixth year of the six team tournament.

Results 

* - Indicates game required 12 innings. † - Indicates game required 10 innings.

All-Tournament Team 
The following players were named to the All-Tournament Team.

Most Valuable Player 
Brian Bixler won the Tournament Most Valuable Player award. Bixler played for Eastern Michigan.

References 

Tournament
Mid-American Conference Baseball Tournament
Mid-American Conference baseball tournament
Mid-American Conference baseball tournament